Jebavý (feminine Jebavá) is a Czech surname. It is an adjective derivation of a verb "jebat", which is a vulgar term for a sexual intercourse. Notable people include:
 Jiří Jebavý, Czech ice hockey player
 Roman Jebavý, Czech tennis player
 Václav Jebavý (real name of Otokar Březina), Czech poet

Czech-language surnames